Spezialeinsatzkommando (SEK, "Special Task Force") are police tactical units of each of the 16 German State Police forces. Along with the Mobile Einsatzkommando (MEK), Personenschutzkommando (bodyguards), and the Verhandlungsgruppe (negotiation teams in some states), they are part of the police Spezialeinheiten of each state.

Mainly unrecognized by the media and public, the main missions of SEK units are to serve high-risk arrest warrants and to deal with barricaded suspects. Hostage sieges, kidnappings, and raids also belong to their missions as well as other scenarios like personal security details for VIPs or witnesses. Since the 1970s, each SEK has handled several thousand deployments. The front-runner is the SEK of the Berlin Police with up to 500 deployments a year, an average of 1.4 deployments a day.

The comparable unit of the German Federal Police is the GSG 9.

History

In 1974, the first SEK unit was raised in police forces of the state of North Rhine-Westphalia.

After West and East Germany were unified in 1990, some ex-officers of the Diensteinheit IX in the Volkspolizei were merged into the SEKs after thorough political evaluation procedures, such as with SEK units in Mecklenburg-Vorpommern and in Sachsen-Anhalt.

The SEK received a name change from Sondereinsatzkommando to Spezialeinsatzkommando, announced in 2013, because the former is usually associated with Sondereinsatzkommando Eichmann, a unit in the Nazi Schutzstaffel (SS) tasked with overseeing the deportation of Hungary's Jewish residents.

In 2015, the SEK was called in to intervene in Erfurt, Thuringia after a 48-year-old man barricaded himself in his apartment and acted violently towards emergency medical personnel. An SEK operator was wounded during the raid.

In 2015, the SEK Cologne has been accused of harassment while performing an initiation ritual on a new member. These charges were later dropped. Meanwhile, Ex-GSG9 commander Ulrich Wegener accused the SEK of being badly disciplined since the officers were not punished.

A Reichsbürgerbewegung supporter was confronted by the police in 2016 in Bavaria with the SEK deployed.  One operator was shot dead after they were ordered to seize the man's weapons due to him being mentally unfit to handle them.

On June 10, 2021, Interior Minister for the state of Hesse Peter Beuth announced that its SEK unit in Frankfurt will be disbanded since some of its operators were reported to be sharing alt-right messages.

Organization
The organization of special police forces varies from state to state. Whilst most states have created one SEK which is based in their capital city, others have more than one. North Rhine-Westphalia Police or Rheinland-Pfalz State Police have established SEKs in other major cities as needed. The Bavarian State Police and Hessen State Police both have two SEKs – one each for the north and the south.

Most SEKs would have 40 to 70 operators attached, depending on the state.

A SEK unit can be attached to the Bereitschaftspolizei riot police or to big regional police headquarters. However, the common trend is to put the SEK units under control of the Landeskriminalamt (LKA). Many LKA have special divisions which consist of the SEK, MEK and crisis negotiation teams.

The internal organisation of SEKs rests with the units and therefore differs as well.

The SEK of South Bavaria has an alpine component and the SEK units of Bremen and Hamburg have elements trained for maritime tasks. Some SEKs also have specialized negotiation groups (Verhandlungsgruppen, commonly abbreviated as VGs) for cases like hostage situations or suicide attempts.

Eligibility and training
Any state police officer is eligible to apply for service in a SEK unit, but it is common only to consider applications from officers with at least three years of duty experience. The age limit is mostly between 23 and 35 years, whilst operatives have to leave the entry teams when they reach the age of 42 (or 45 in some states). Both sexes are eligible to apply.

At the moment, only the SEK units of Hamburg, Schleswig-Holstein, and Southern Hesse have women in their ranks.

The requirements demand physical and mental strength, discernment, and capacity for teamwork. About 30 percent of all candidates pass the tests. The length of the training necessary to become an operative in a SEK unit differs but is generally five to eight months long and covers a wide range of required skills. Some of their training requires SEK operators to train with other police forces in Europe and North America.

All applications made to join the SEK are made online. SEK operators usually get a stipend between 150 and 400 Euros, depending on the state police force where they work in.

Equipment

While firearms are still issued by the forces, SEK officers can order equipment they feel suit best for the missions. The following weapons are used by SEK:
 Glock 17
 Heckler & Koch VP9, used by Saxony SEK.
 Heckler & Koch P30 used by Hesse State Police and Federal Police MFE (covert commando)
 SIG P226
 SIG P228
 Korth-type revolvers
 Heckler & Koch USP pistols are utilized by some states.
 Smith & Wesson Model 625, modified to be suppressed for Northrhine-Westphalia SEK operators.
 Heckler & Koch MP5
 Heckler & Koch MP7
 Heckler & Koch UMP
 Heckler & Koch G36, used by Brandenburg SEK.
 FN SCAR Mk 16
 FN SCAR Mk 17
 Steyr AUG, only used by Bavaria SEK.
 Haenel CR223 carbine, only used by Hamburg SEKs/MEKs and Saxony SEKs.
 Heckler & Koch PSG1

The North Rhine-Westphalia SEK use Ford F-550 pickups modified to use MARS tactical ladders for raids on hard to reach places. The Saxony Police use the RMMV Survivor R and the Toyota Land Cruiser equipped with V8 engines as a first response vehicle. The Brandenburg State Police and the Hamburg State Police use the PMV Survivor I 
for its SEK units.
The SEK of the Bavarian State Police uses the LAPV Enok.

Uniforms
SEK members do not always operate in uniform but do wear masks to protect their identities, as well as to protect their bodies from burns. If cited in a trial they are only referred to by numbers.

When off-duty SEK officers are called to a crime scene, they may appear plain-clothed, only wearing their special protective gear and carrying their weapons.

Related units

MEK 

Mobile Einsatzkommandos (MEK) operate hand-in-hand with the SEKs.

These plain-clothed units specialize in surveillance, quick arrests and mobile hostage sieges. They are used in investigations against organized crime, blackmailers or other serious offenses.

MEKs also provide close protection for a state's senior leaders, including the state's minister president or interior minister. Requirements for duty as a MEK officer are similar but partially less strict than the requirements for the SEK.

Images

See also
 Zentrale Unterstützungsgruppe Zoll

Notes

References

External links

Police units of Germany
Police tactical units
ATLAS Network